Justice Bao, Justice Pao, Judge Bao, Judge Pao, Lord Bao, Lord Pao, Magistrate Bao and Magistrate Pao are all references to Bao Zheng (999–1062, also romanized as Pao Cheng), legendary Song dynasty official and the Chinese symbol of justice.

These terms may also refer to:

TV series
 Justice Pao (1974 TV series), a 1974–1975 Taiwanese TV series starring Yi Ming
 Judge Bao (TV series), a 1987 Chinese TV series starring Bai Zhidi
 Justice Pao (1993 TV series), a 1993–1994 Taiwanese TV series starring Jin Chao-chun
 Justice Pao (1994 TVB series), a 1994 Hong Kong TV series produced by TVB, starring Jin Chao-chun 
 Justice Pao (1995 TVB series), a 1995 Hong Kong TV series produced by TVB, starring Ti Lung
 Justice Pao (1995 Asia Television series), a 1995 Hong Kong TV series produced by Asia Television, starring Jin Chao-chun
 Return of Judge Bao, a 2003 Taiwanese TV series starring Jin Chao-chun
 Justice Pao (2004 TV series), a 2004 Chinese TV series starring Wang Xuebing
 Justice Bao (2008 TV series), a 2008 Chinese TV series starring Jin Chao-chun
 Justice Bao (2010 TV series), a 2010–2012 Chinese TV series starring Jin Chao-chun

Songs
 "Bao Qing Tian", the theme song of the series. It was also the theme song of the 1993–1994 series as well as the 2003 Hong Kong film Cat and Mouse.

See also
The Seven Heroes and Five Gallants (disambiguation)
The Three Heroes and Five Gallants (disambiguation)
Wu Shu Nao Dong Jing (disambiguation)
Young Justice Bao (disambiguation)
Judge Bao fiction, topical overview of fiction about Bao Zheng 

Cultural depictions of Bao Zheng